Tristan de Lange (born 15 June 1997) is a Namibian road cyclist and mountain biker. He qualified for the road race at the 2020 Summer Olympics, having to act as a replacement for Dan Craven after he tested positive for Covid-19. De Lange won the Namibian Desert Dash mountain bike race in 2021.

Major results

Road
2015
 National Junior Road Championships
1st  Road race
1st  Time trial
 3rd  Team time trial, African Junior Road Championships
2020
 2nd Road race, National Road Championships
2021
 2nd Road race, National Road Championships
 2nd Overall Tour de Windhoek
1st Stage 3
2023
 1st  Road race, National Road Championships

Mountain bike

2014
 1st  National Junior XCO Championships
2015
 1st  African Junior XCO Championships
 1st  National Junior XCO Championships
2016
 1st  Team relay, African Championships
 1st  National Under-23 XCO Championships
2017
 1st  African Under-23 XCO Championships
2018
 1st  National XCO Championships
 1st  National XCM Championships
 2nd  African Under-23 XCO Championships
2019
 African Games
1st  Cross-country
1st  Cross-country marathon
2021
1st Desert Dash Namibia (11 December 2021)

References

External links
 

1997 births
Living people
Namibian male cyclists
Cyclists at the 2018 Commonwealth Games
Commonwealth Games competitors for Namibia
African Games gold medalists for Namibia
Competitors at the 2019 African Games
African Games medalists in cycling
Olympic cyclists of Namibia
Cyclists at the 2020 Summer Olympics
White Namibian people
20th-century Namibian people
21st-century Namibian people